Zašová is a municipality and village in Vsetín District in the Zlín Region of the Czech Republic. It has about 3,000 inhabitants.

Administrative parts
The village of Veselá is an administrative part od Zašová.

History
Zašová was founded in the 14th century. In 1985, the municipality of Veselá was merged with Zašová.

Twin towns – sister cities

Zašová is twinned with:
 Nová Ľubovňa, Slovakia

Zašová also cooperates with Veľký Meder and Vrútky in Slovakia.

References

External links

Villages in Vsetín District
Moravian Wallachia